The 1816 Delaware gubernatorial election was held on October 1, 1816. Incumbent Federalist Governor Daniel Rodney was unable to seek re-election due to term limits. Former State Representative John Clark ran as the Federalist nominee, and narrowly defeated Democratic-Republican nominee Manaen Bull to hold the office for his party.

General election

Results

References

Bibliography
 
 
 

1816
Delaware
Gubernatorial